Power harassment is a form of harassment and workplace bullying in which someone in a position of greater power uses that power to harass or bully a lower-ranking person. It includes a range of behavior from mild irritation and annoyances to serious abuses which can even involve forced activity beyond the boundaries of the job description. Prohibited in some countries, power harassment is considered a form of illegal discrimination and political and psychological abuse. Types of power harassment include physical or psychological attacks, segregation, excessive or demeaning work assignments, and intrusion upon the victim's personal life.

Power harassment may combine with other forms of bias and harassment, including sexual harassment. In the context of sexual harassment, power harassment is distinguished from contra power harassment, in which the harasser is of lower rank than that of the victim, and peer harassment, in which the victim and harasser are of the same rank. The term "political power harassment" was coined by Ramona Rush in a 1993 paper on sexual harassment in academia. Because it operates to reinforce and justify an existing hierarchy, political power harassment can be difficult to assess.

By country

Japan 

Although power harassment is not unique to Japan, it has received significant attention in Japan as a policy and legal problem since the 1990s. A government survey in 2016 found that more than 30% of workers had experienced power harassment in the preceding three years. The Japanese term "power harassment" was independently coined by Yasuko Okada of Tokoha Gakuen Junior College in 2002. The Japanese courts have applied the general compensation principle of Article 709 of the Civil Code of Japan to compensate victims of workplace bullying and power harassment.

In 2019, the National Diet adopted the Power Harassment Prevention Act, which amends the Labor Policy Comprehensive Promotion Act to require employers to address power harassment.  The 2019 act creates a new Chapter 8 that addresses “remarks and behavior of people taking advantage of their superior positions in the workplace that exceed what is necessary and appropriate for the conduct of business, thereby harming the working environment of employees.” The law took effect for large employers on June 1, 2020.  It prohibits the retaliatory discharge of employees who complain about power harassment and requires employers to put systems in place for reporting and addressing power harassment.

South Korea

The topic of power harassment is known in South Korea as Gapjil, and it has been recently increasingly discussed in Korean media and scholarly works.

Example

Many workers are forced by their superiors to perform tasks outside of their job description and working hours. It is common for workers to be fired or suffer severe repercussions if they do not satisfy their superior's orders, despite there being no justifiable basis for such orders.
Situations exist where employees are treated in a manner that far oversteps the bounds of what is proper between a boss and his or her workers. Someone in a position of power should never be allowed to exercise the power in a bullying or discriminatory fashion. This can create an unhappy and unsafe work environment not just for those being harassed but for the entire work force.
Typical examples of power harassment include:
 being scolded in front of other colleagues, rebuked in a loud voice
 neglect
 false evaluation and demotion.

See also
Abuse of power
Karoshi
Lay-off
Master suppression techniques
Power politics
Power (social and political)
Rankism
Sweatshop
Workplace bullying

References

Abuse
Aggression
Workplace bullying
Business law
Labour law
Labor relations
Economy of Japan
Harassment
Power (social and political) concepts